The Chibanian, widely known as the Middle Pleistocene, is an age in the international geologic timescale or a stage in chronostratigraphy, being a division of the Pleistocene Epoch within the ongoing Quaternary Period. The Chibanian name was officially ratified in January 2020. It is currently estimated to span the time between 0.770 Ma (770,000 years ago) and 0.126 Ma (126,000 years ago), also expressed as 770–126 ka. It includes the transition in palaeoanthropology from the Lower to the Middle Paleolithic over 300 ka.

The Chibanian is preceded by the Calabrian and succeeded by the proposed Tarantian. The beginning of the Chibanian is the Brunhes–Matuyama reversal, when the Earth's magnetic field last underwent reversal. It ends with the onset of the Eemian interglacial period (Marine Isotope Stage 5).

The term Middle Pleistocene was in use as a provisional or "quasi-formal" designation by the International Union of Geological Sciences (IUGS). While the three lowest ages of the Pleistocene, the Gelasian, Calabrian and Chibanian have been officially defined, the Late Pleistocene has yet to be formally defined, along with consideration of a proposed Anthropocene sub-division of the Holocene.

Definition process
The International Union of Geological Sciences (IUGS) had previously proposed replacement of the Middle Pleistocene by an Ionian Age based on strata found in Italy. In November 2017, however, the Chibanian (based on strata at a site in Chiba Prefecture, Japan) replaced the Ionian as the Subcommission on Quaternary Stratigraphy's preferred GSSP proposal for the age that should replace the Middle Pleistocene sub-epoch. The "Chibanian" name was ratified by the IUGS in January 2020.

Palaeoanthropology
The Chibanian includes the transition in palaeoanthropology from the Lower to the Middle Paleolithic: i.e., the emergence of Homo sapiens sapiens between 300 ka and 400 ka. The oldest known human DNA dates to the Middle Pleistocene, around 430,000 years ago. This is the oldest found, .

Chronology

See also
 Mid-Pleistocene Transition
 100,000-year problem
 Pleistocene megafauna

References 

 
02
Geological ages
Pleistocene geochronology
Cenozoic geochronology